Nancy Allan (born July 25, 1952, in Winnipeg, Manitoba) is a politician in Manitoba, Canada. She was a cabinet minister in the New Democratic Party governments of premiers Gary Doer and Greg Selinger.

Allan was raised in MacGregor, Manitoba, and was educated at MacGregor Collegiate. From 1990 to 1994, she was director of development for the Canadian Diabetes Association. She worked for the Manitoba Motion Picture Industries Association from 1994 to 1995, and then as a consultant for small business and non-profit organizations from 1995 to 1999. She has also taught two continuing education courses at the University of Winnipeg.

Allan began her political career as a school trustee, serving on the Norwood School Division from 1995 to 1998 and the St. Boniface School Division from 1998 to 1999. She was elected to the Legislative Assembly of Manitoba in the 1999 provincial election, defeating incumbent Progressive Conservative MLA Shirley Render in the south-central Winnipeg riding of St. Vital by 5218 votes to 3699.

In 2003 she supported Bill Blaikie's bid to become leader of the federal New Democratic Party.

In the 2003 election Allan was re-elected with over 63% of the popular vote. On November 4, 2003, she entered cabinet as Minister of Labour of Immigration, with responsibility for Multiculturalism, Status of Women and administration of the Workers Compensation Act. Allan was re-elected in the 2007 provincial election.

After Greg Selinger succeeded Gary Doer as premier of Manitoba, he appointed Allan as the Minister of Education on November 3, 2009.

During her term as education minister, Allan introduced anti-bullying legislation: Bill 18, the public schools amendment act (safe and inclusive schools). Religious organizations criticized the legislation, claiming it infringed on freedom of religion by requiring faith-based schools to support the creation of gay–straight alliances if initiated by students. The federal Minister of Public Safety at the time, Vic Toews, said that he believed the bill violated the Canadian Charter of Rights and Freedoms. The bill passed into law in September 2013.

On October 18, 2013, Nancy Allan was removed from the post of education minister by Premier Greg Selinger.

References

1952 births
Living people
Manitoba school board members
Members of the Executive Council of Manitoba
New Democratic Party of Manitoba MLAs
Politicians from Winnipeg
Women MLAs in Manitoba
Women government ministers of Canada
21st-century Canadian politicians
21st-century Canadian women politicians